Pandanus thwaitesii is a monocot species of plant in the family Pandanaceae. It is native to India, Sri Lanka.

Uses
leaves- mats, boxes.

Sources
 http://www.theplantlist.org/tpl/record/kew-285024

References

 http://mpnet.ior-rcstt.com/node/3361
 http://e-monocot.org/taxon/urn:kew.org:wcs:taxon:285024
 http://plants.jstor.org/specimen/p02131269?history=true

Flora of Sri Lanka
thwaitesii